Robert Overdo may refer to:

Robert Overdo (fl.1368-1386), MP for Appleby
Robert Overdo (fl.1402), MP for Appleby, probably son/nephew of above